William Lang Wisdom (30 May 1912 – 9 March 1940) was a former Australian rules footballer who played with Richmond in the Victorian Football League (VFL). He died in a car accident in Adelaide, aged 27. The vehicle he was travelling in collided with a tram.

Notes

External links 
		

1912 births
1940 deaths
Australian rules footballers from South Australia
Richmond Football Club players
North Adelaide Football Club players
North Shore Australian Football Club players
Road incident deaths in South Australia